The 2021 Western Carolina Catamounts football team represented the Western Carolina University as a member of the Southern Conference (SoCon) during the 2021 NCAA Division I FCS football season. Led by first-year head coach Kerwin Bell, the Catamounts compiled an overall record of 4–7 with a mark of 4–4 in conference play, tying for fourth place in the SoCon. Western Carolina played their home games at Bob Waters Field at E. J. Whitmire Stadium in Cullowhee, North Carolina.

Coaching staff

Schedule

References

Western Carolina
Western Carolina Catamounts football seasons
Western Carolina Catamounts football